Central New York Raceway Park is a motorsports complex currently under construction in Central Square, New York, United States.  The complex will feature a 2.2 mile (3.54 km) road course and a 5/8 mile synthetic dirt oval for both auto & harness racing. The 2.2 mile road course was designed by Peter Argetsinger and will be the only natural terrain road course in North America featuring a permanent lighting system. The 5/8 mile synthetic dirt oval will also feature a smaller oval for go-karts and flat track speedway bike racing.

In September 2015, the track announced that the 5/8 mile synthetic dirt oval will host Super DIRT Week featuring the Super DIRTcar Series starting in 2016.  While the road course & oval tracks have been under development, the circuit also hosts the SCCA CNY Region Rallycross.

In March 2016, the track announced that the 5/8 mile synthetic dirt oval will host the AMA Pro Flat Track on August 20, 2016. CNYRP also announced that MotoAmerica will race on the 2.2 mile road course in 2017.

Construction on the road course and dirt track stalled in 2016, and as of 2021 the project effectively remains in limbo.

References

External links
 Official Website

Motorsport venues in New York (state)
Sports venues in Oswego County, New York
2015 establishments in New York (state)
Sports venues completed in 2015